Hanson Truman Hughes (–?) was an American politician and state legislator in North Carolina. He represented Granville County, North Carolina in the North Carolina House of Representatives in 1876. He was one of five African Americans serving in the North Carolina Senate in 1876 to 1877. He also worked as a barber.

Early life
Hanson Truman Hughes was born in North Carolina. He may have been enslaved prior to the American Civil War ending. Hanson lived in early life in Oxford, a town in Granville County, North Carolina; and in later life he lived in Charlotte, North Carolina.

He had been married to Delia Ann (née Reid) (1841–1897), together they had 7 children.

Career 

Starting around 1866, he worked as a barber. He owned land and personal property of substantial value and became a leader within the Black community.

In the State v. Hanson T. Hughes et. al., he was prosecuted alongside others in 1875, for leading a procession with horses in Oxford, North Carolina in celebration of the emancipation proclamation.

Hanson served two terms in the North Carolina state assembly and one term in the North Carolina state senate. He represented Granville County in the North Carolina House of Representatives, alongside William Crews. In April 1881, Hughes was appointed as justice of the peace in Oxford Township.

References

1840 births
Year of death missing
African-American politicians during the Reconstruction Era
People from North Carolina
People from Oxford, North Carolina
People from Charlotte, North Carolina
Members of the North Carolina House of Representatives